Giovanni Morini (born February 2, 1995) is an Italian professional ice hockey forward currently playing for HC Lugano in the Swiss National League (NL) and the Italian national team.

He participated at the 2017 IIHF World Championship.

References

External links

1995 births
Living people
Italian ice hockey forwards
Sportspeople from Como
Italian expatriate ice hockey people
Italian expatriate sportspeople in Switzerland
HC Lugano players
HCB Ticino Rockets players
Twin sportspeople
Italian twins